The Pond Eddy Bridge is a petit truss bridge spanning the Delaware River between the hamlet of Pond Eddy in Lumberland, New York and the settlement informally called Pond Eddy in Shohola Township, Pennsylvania. It is accessible from NY 97 in Lumberland on the New York side and two dead-end local roads, Flagstone Road (State Route 1011) and Rosa Road on the Pennsylvania side. The bridge was built in 1903 by the Oswego Bridge Company to replace an old suspension bridge that had washed away in a flood earlier in the year. It connected the bluestone quarries in Pennsylvania to New York.

The bridge remained intact for many years and, in 1963, it was rededicated as the All Veterans Memorial Bridge by two local veterans groups. In 1998, it was nominated for the U.S. National Register of Historic Places for its engineering significance; it is also listed in the New York State Register of Historic Places.

Over the years, the bridge's condition has deteriorated, weakening its retaining strength. The National Bridge Inventory Survey categorizes its condition as "Structurally Deficient" and "Basically intolerable requiring high priority of replacement". In 2005, the town of Narrowsburg passed a resolution calling on the Pennsylvania Department of Transportation (PennDOT) to replace the bridge. There has also been a local movement to save the bridge. The bluestone quarries are no longer active, but the bridge still serves as the only access to 26 homes on the Pennsylvania side and the only access those residents have to emergency services. Because of the state of the bridge, planning for its replacement began in 1999. An accident involving a dump truck in 2015 accelerated the replacement of the bridge, completed in November 2018.

History

The 1870 suspension bridge

Settlement around Pond Eddy was triggered by the Delaware and Hudson Canal, which was constructed in the 1820s. The Erie Railroad, on the Pennsylvania side, also contributed to the community's growth. After Pond Eddy continued to grow in both states, local officials decided a bridge should be erected to connect the two communities. The new bridge would make it easier to ship bluestone, slate and lumber via the railroad. In 1870, a new bridge was funded with taxpayer's money and the Town of Lumberland in New York helped build the new Pond Eddy Bridge. The new bridge was a wire-rope suspension bridge, similar to those used by John Augustus Roebling. James D. Decker, then the Sullivan County sheriff and former Lumberland town supervisor was hired to supervise the construction of the bridge. He lived so close to the bridge site that it was soon nicknamed "Decker's Bridge".

Historians believe that from the beginning of the bridge's life, it was toll-free for Lumberland residents. Eventually the town leased the bridge out to private individuals, who collected tolls indiscriminately. During times when bridge could not be leased, the town retained control. The tollhouse was later removed and sold. It is now a home. Originally, the settlement of Pond Eddy on the Pennsylvania side was named Flagstone, but changed to its current name upon construction. Both Pond Eddys expanded rapidly. A new railroad station was created in Pond Eddy on the Pennsylvania side. The riverfront location on the New York side had two stores, a Methodist church, a telegraph office, eighteen homes and a new hotel with a restaurant. The hotel had new owners around the time of the bridge and eventually became a large stop for travelers. The Pond Eddy Bridge served the town of Lumberland well in the late 19th century, but the area's prosperity did not last. The canal went out of business in 1898, after years of competition from railroads. The Erie station on the Pennsylvania had no roads to go anywhere, and the community began to decline. Decker died at 77 years old in 1900, having lived long enough to experience the rise and fall of Pond Eddy.

The 1903 petit truss bridge 
In 1903, the "floods of the century" struck the Delaware River Valley. Two storms of massive strength, including one from the Great Lakes converged in New Jersey, Pennsylvania and New York on October 9, causing massive flooding. The Riverside Hotel received little damage, but homes and businesses were damaged heavily as well as the railroad. The 1870 bridge was destroyed in the storm. Lumberland hired the Oswego Bridge Company to build a replacement for $28,900 ($ in contemporary dollars). The company built the current two-span, one-lane steel structure.

The lumber industries and stone mines on both sides of the river were eventually exhausted and closed. Tourists coming up the river from Port Jervis became the mainstay of the local economy. During the next two decades, seasonal homes and hotels were built in Pond Eddy.

During the 1920s, the Joint Bridge Commission in Pennsylvania and New York started buying up the tolled bridges along the Delaware. The town of Lumberland offered the Pond Eddy bridge to the Commission, but was refused. The bridge, according to the Commission, was already toll-free and adequately maintained. However, the town was eager to get rid of the responsibility to maintain the two-decade old structure, and continued to try. Finally in 1926, the Lumberland town supervisor, a friend of Pennsylvania Governor Gifford Pinchot, offered the commission the bridge for $1; around the same time, the commission paid $55,000 ($ in  dollars) for the Narrowsburg–Darbytown Bridge. The Joint Commission became the owner of both bridges. Since then the bridge's history has been virtually uneventful, surviving the flooding during the remains of Hurricane Diane in 1955 with little damage.

Replacement plans
In 2005, the community of Narrowsburg, New York, several miles upstream, requested that Pennsylvania Department of Transportation replace the 102-year-old structure. It had already had its weight limits reduced. The same year, an engineering firm in Millburn, New Jersey reported replacing the bridge would cost about $6.16 million, while keeping it would cost even more and raise its life expectancy by no more than 15 years. The Upper Delaware Council said that the 8 ton (7.2 tonne) limit on the bridge was inadequate for service trucks and emergency vehicles. The Shohola Township supervisors support maintaining the existing bridge, but the Lumberland Town Board was not convinced that it would be sufficient.

More proposals were made in 2007. Replacing the bridge would cost $7–8 million and take two years to complete. Rehabilitation would require bringing the bridge up to code so it could carry loads of up to 40 tons (36 tonnes). A preservation group formed to oppose a replacement. Its founder compared the bridge to the Dingmans Ferry Bridge on the Pennsylvania–New Jersey border, which carries similar traffic loads. One possibility is to replace the bridge, and move the antique structure elsewhere in Sullivan County, since it is a popular tourist attraction. In June 2008, a compromise was made defining the possibility of a $12 million bridge to replace the 104-year-old deteriorating structure. PennDOT has suggested that they will let anyone preserve the bridge by taking it somewhere else. However, there has been no response, and plans for the new bridge were initially scheduled to begin by 2010.

PennDOT began the Route 1011-Pond Eddy Bridge Replacement Project. Route 1011 is the internal designation for Flagstone Road, one of the two side roads in Pennsylvania along with the bridge. The state has proposed a four-span bridge with three connecting bridge piers, with four side options: replacing the bridge upstream, buying out the 26 residences on the Pennsylvania side, rehabilitating the structure to handle weights of 16-18 tons or maintain the bridge in its current form. Depending on which project is chosen, the estimated start would be in 2013, when the structure reaches its 110th year in use. The entire project would cost $8.5–11 million. Opponents of demolishing the bridge hope that they can find a place to move the bridge, which would cost $500,000, and have the new owners maintain it.

On December 17, 2010, PennDOT's District 4 downposted the bridge's weight limit to four tons due to deterioration on the bridge. PennDOT will also front $350,000–$500,000 to replace 70 planks on the bridge, which will then restore the weight back to seven tons. Signage has already adjusted for the demotion by both PennDOT and Sullivan County. Replacement began on April 18, 2011 of 64 stringer beams and on May 25, the project was completed, less than a month ahead of schedule. The seven-ton weight limit was also restored as a result of the completed construction. The cost of the project totaled out to $493,000 (2011 USD).

Officials from the state of New York stopped the replacement project in 2012 due to concerns of the local preservationist group, Save the Pond Eddy Bridge, which complained that the $12 million (2012 USD) project would only serve twelve families in Shohola Township and was a waste of taxpayer funding. The new bridge would look similar to the original structure and would cost about $9 million (2013 USD) to construct. The 15-month project however would require the Delaware River to have the waters below rerouted for the construction.

On July 14, 2014, PennDOT announced that they were opening bids on selling the Pond Eddy Bridge for people who wish to reassemble to use it as a bridge within the next ten years. The agency also sent out invitations for all municipalities in Lackawanna, Luzerne, Pike, Susquehanna, Wayne and Wyoming counties.

In October 2015, a dump truck carrying stone dust lost its brakes coming down the hill directly in front of the bridge; it crossed the bridge and crashed. The stress of the accident accelerated the replacement of the bridge. Demolition of the old bridge entered the final phase on November 6, 2018. The project was completed in November 2018.

See also
List of bridges on the National Register of Historic Places in New York
List of crossings of the Delaware River
New York–Pennsylvania Joint Interstate Bridge Commission
National Register of Historic Places listings in Pike County, Pennsylvania
National Register of Historic Places listings in Sullivan County, New York

References

External links

Bridges completed in 1904
Road bridges on the National Register of Historic Places in New York (state)
Road bridges on the National Register of Historic Places in Pennsylvania
National Register of Historic Places in Sullivan County, New York
Bridges over the Delaware River
Bridges in Pike County, Pennsylvania
Bridges in Sullivan County, New York
Former toll bridges in New York (state)
Former toll bridges in Pennsylvania
Oswego Bridge Company
Steel bridges in the United States
Pratt truss bridges in the United States
1904 establishments in New York (state)
1904 establishments in Pennsylvania
New York–Pennsylvania Joint Interstate Bridge Commission